Chasetown (Church Street) is a heritage railway station on the Chasewater Railway.  It is the north-eastern terminus of the line and consists of a single platform with a run-round loop.  The station was constructed in 2000 as part of the extension of the line, that was undertaken following the construction of the M6 Toll Motorway. There are no station buildings.

The station is adjacent to Burntwood Rugby Club, and when the station was first built it was directly accessible from Chasetown, via the Rugby Club. Since the construction of phase 3 of the Burntwood Bypass in 2004, direct access to Chasetown is now via a footbridge. Chasewater Heaths railway station is just to the north, indeed to get to Chasetown by road one has to go past Chasewater Heaths.

References

Heritage railway stations in Staffordshire
Burntwood
Railway stations built for UK heritage railways